The following is an episode list for the British sitcom Is It Legal?, which won the 1995 British Comedy Award for 'Best ITV Sitcom'.

Series 1: 1995

Death In Hounslow

Synopsis

Colin starts his first day at Lotus, Spackman & Phelps and accidentally kills a client, Stella has to settle a dispute over who gets to keep their dog and Bob tries desperately to piece together files that were shredded.

Cast
Charles Simon
[Mr Dobson]

John Thomson
[Paramedic]

Rupert Bates
[Man with Dog]

Cate Fowler
[Woman with Dog]

Whodunnit

Synopsis

Stella gets arrested for drink-driving and Bob tries to discover who has photocopied their bottom.

Cast

Darren Tunstall
[Policeman]

Billie Reynolds
[Jacinta]

Dick's House Of Horror

Synopsis

Dick buys a new house which hasn't been surveyed properly, Darren tries to celebrate his birthday and Alison tries to stay awake.

Cast

Michael Troughton
[Mr Arnold]

Alan Talbot
[Homeowner]

Colin Heals The World

Synopsis

Colin goes to court to promote the firm and meets a prostitute while Stella tries to win £40,000 in compensation for her client.

Cast

Mark Lewis
[Detective Inspector]

Charlotte Weston
[Jane]

Iain Mitchell
[Giles Brindley-Sherman]

Infatuation

Synopsis

Lotus, Spackman and Phelps has a person on work experience and is popular with everyone except Bob while Darren tries to sue Mr. Bappy for food poisoning.

Cast

Raymond Coulthard
[Peter]

Bob Breaks In

Synopsis

Bob has to break into his own house to retrieve some documents while Dick has stolen £30,000 from a client to buy a boat.

Cast

Patricia Garwood
[Belinda Foulkes]

Resignation

Synopsis

Stella is considering her resignation from the firm which Colin and Dick find out about while Bob still tries to win Sarah's heart

Cast

There were no guest actors in this episode.

Series 2: 1996

Solicitors In Love

Synopsis

Bob's marriage continues to fall apart while Stella has a new man in her life.

Cast

David Hounslow
[Policeman]

Hounslow FM

Synopsis

Dick has been invited to solve legal problems on the local radio station while Colin plans his annual holiday.

Cast

Jono Coleman
[DJ]

Alison Gets Laid

Synopsis

Stella questions whether anyone in the firm actually likes her while Alison sleeps with Sarah's boyfriend.

Cast

Ben Miles
[Tom]

Darren's Revenge

Synopsis

Lotus, Spackman, and Phelps are moving with the times as they try and use computers, Stella and Colin are forced to play golf with a wealthy client and Darren discovers he might be sacked.

Cast

Chris Langham
[David Etherington]

Dick In Court

Synopsis

Dick is forced to represent one of Stella's clients in court, Colin brings his dog to work and Bob finally gets a date with Sarah.

Cast

There were no guest actors in this episode.

Office Party

Synopsis

Lotus, Spackman,and Phelps are holding their annual office party which they soon regret while a prisoner has requested Colin to be his solicitor.

Cast

Ian Bartholomew [Terry Beath]

Kate Lonergan [Mrs Beath]

Indecision

Synopsis

A rival firm has offered to buy Lotus, Spackman and Phelps where it falls on Colin to make a decision while Bob tries to decide whether to give his marriage a chance or to go on a date with Sarah.

Cast

There were no guest actors in this episode.

Series 3: 1998

A Question Of Pants

Synopsis

Dick has retired so Colin has been given his old office while Darren wonders whether Alison, whose bra is peeping out for much of the episode, wears any knickers.

Cast

There were no guest stars in this episode.

Polishing The Mouse

Synopsis

Darren is caught masturbating in Stella's office while Stella celebrates being at the firm for twenty years.

Cast

There were no guest stars in this episode.

Big Desk Bob

Synopsis

Bob has his uncle's desk delivered to the office while he and Stella try to keep their relationship a secret from everybody else.

Cast

There were no guest stars in this episode.

Glad To Be Colin

Synopsis

Colin questions his sexuality while Sarah returns to the office which makes Bob pleased and Stella jealous.

Cast

There were no guest stars in this episode

New Bloke

Synopsis

A new solicitor has joined the firm who annoys Stella but charms everyone else while Darren decides to change his name.

Cast

Alexander Armstrong [Nick Bairstow]

Someone Is Lying

Synopsis

Colin decides to hold a house party but at the end of the night one hundred pounds has gone missing and tries to find out who has stolen it.

Cast

Andrew Clover [Steve]

Louise Rolfe [Yvonne]

1979

Synopsis

Darren is asked to retrieve a box of files dating from 1979 and in it there's a discovery of a nineteen-year-old secret.

Cast

There were no guest actors in this episode.

Is it Legal?